Böyük Kəsik (formerly, V.İ.Lenin) is a village and municipality in the Agstafa Rayon of Azerbaijan.  It has a population of 1,791.

References 

Populated places in Aghstafa District